Chaparral is derived from the Spanish word chaparro (translation: "a forest made of short trees") and applies to a biome found in California and other Mediterranean climates.

Chaparral may also refer to:

Biology
 Geococcyx, a genus of birds commonly known as roadrunners, also known as chaparral birds, chaparral cocks, or chaparrals
 Larrea divaricata, a South American plant also known as chaparral
 Larrea tridentata, a North American plant, also known as the creosote bush, used in Native American medicine and modern herbology under the name of chaparral

Geography
 Chaparral, Calgary, a neighbourhood in Calgary, Alberta, Canada
 Chaparral, New Mexico, a census-designated place in New Mexico, USA
 Chaparral, Tolima, a Colombian municipality of the Department of Tolima
 El Chaparral, border crossing from San Diego, USA to Tijuana, Mexico

Arts, entertainment, and media
 Stanford Chaparral, a Stanford University humor magazine
 The High Chaparral, an American 1967–71 Western-genre TV series

Schools
Chaparral High School (Arizona), in Scottsdale, Arizona
Chaparral High School (Colorado), in Parker, Colorado
Chaparral High School (Nevada), in Las Vegas, Nevada
Chaparral High School, Temecula, California, in Temecula, California
Chaparral Middle School (Diamond Bar), in Diamond Bar, California
Chaparral Middle School (Moorpark), in Moorpark, California

Sports
 Dallas Chaparrals, an American Basketball Association basketball team that became the San Antonio Spurs in 1973
 Lubbock Christian Chaparrals and Lady Chaps, the athletics division of Lubbock Christian University
 The Chaparral, the athletic mascot of the College of DuPage, in DuPage County, Illinois

Transportation
 Chaparral Boats, a line of pleasure boats manufactured in the USA
 Chaparral Cars, a motorsports manufacturer from North America

Other uses
 High Chaparral Theme Park, a Western theme park in Sweden
 MIM-72 Chaparral, a U.S. Army surface-to-air missile system based on the AIM-9 Sidewinder

See also
Chaperal, a neighbourhood in Orleans, Ontario, Canada

Spanish words and phrases